Debala Mitra (14 December 1925 – 2 December 2005) was an Indian archaeologist who served as Director General of the Archaeological Survey of India (ASI) from 1981 to 1983. She is the first woman archaeologist to head the ASI. She explored and excavated several Buddhist sites.

Early life 

Born on 14 December 1925 at Khulna in Bengal Province (now Bangladesh), Mitra had her early education in Khulna and Calcutta before obtaining her doctorate in Paris.

In the ASI 

Mitra joined the ASI in the 1940s and served as Superintendent of Eastern Circle and Additional Director General of the ASI before succeeding B. K. Thapar as Director General in 1981.

References 

 

1925 births
2005 deaths
Directors General of the Archaeological Survey of India
People from Khulna
Indian archaeologists
20th-century Indian historians
20th-century Indian archaeologists
Bengali historians